Jon Gilbert is an English bibliophile, historian and the official bibliographer of Ian Fleming, creator of the fictional character James Bond. He is also an authority on J.K. Rowling first editions. He was educated at Caterham School and Roehampton Institute London. 
According to Fleming-family publisher Queen Anne Press, Gilbert is perhaps the foremost expert on the works of Ian Fleming and the literary history of James Bond. Through Adrian Harrington booksellers, he has become an internationally renowned dealer in rare Fleming material, and acts as a consultant to the US registered charity, The Ian Fleming Foundation. Ian Fleming: The Bibliography, which was published in October 2012, is the result of both a career immersed in the writings of Ian Fleming, and four years intensive research following Fleming’s centenary year in 2008. The book was the winner of the 16th ILAB Breslauer Prize for Bibliography, awarded in 2014. Gilbert has appeared on radio and television discussing his subject, and in various Bond-related publications including 007 Magazine, Kiss Kiss Bang Bang and MI6 Confidential. In May 2017, Gilbert gave the lecture Ian Fleming: The Author as Collector at the University of London. In July 2021, Gilbert moderated the specialist webinar 007: The Transatlantic Appeal of James Bond.

Works 
 Painted Decoration in Bookbinding (within The New Bookbinder Annual, 1997)                                                      
 IAN FLEMING: The Bibliography (Queen Anne Press, 2012)  [Regular Edition]
 IAN FLEMING: The Bibliography (Queen Anne Press, 2012)  [Special Edition]
 Ian Fleming. A Catalogue (Adrian Harrington Limited, 2013) [Limited hardcover]
 Ian Fleming. A Catalogue (Adrian Harrington Limited, 2013)  [paperback]
 Onverwachte Miniaturen [translated by Marlene Hoogeven] (in Handboekbinden, the journal of The Dutch Bookbinders Society, Spring 2014)
 Collecting Ian Fleming (within The Book Collector Special Number, Spring 2017)
 Collecting Ian Fleming (Queen Anne Press, June 2017) [Letterpress Printing, Separate Edition]
 Ian Fleming: The Book Collector edited by James Ferguson (Queen Anne Press, 2017, contains Collecting Ian Fleming) [Limited hardcover]
 IAN FLEMING: The Bibliography (Queen Anne Press, 2017)  [New Edition]
 [book review] Ian Fleming: The Notes by John Pearson (author) (within The Book Collector vol.69, no.3, Autumn 2020)
 The Schoyen Collection: Ian Fleming & James Bond (Adrian Harrington Limited, 2020)

References

External links 
 Ian Fleming Publications
 Interview for Spy Vibe
 Financial Times article Online
 Announcement, Queen Anne Press (February 2012)
 ILAB Breslauer Prize for Bibliography
 J.K.Rowling Official Website

1972 births
English bibliographers
English book and manuscript collectors
Living people
People educated at Caterham School
English male non-fiction writers
Alumni of the University of Roehampton